The Temiscaming Royals were a Junior ice hockey team based in Témiscaming, Quebec, Canada.  They were members of the Northern Ontario Junior Hockey League, but originated in the Greater Metro Junior A Hockey League.

History
The announcement of the Temiscaming Royals as the first Quebec-based team in the Greater Metro Junior A Hockey League came on April 4, 2007.

The expansion of the Royals makes them the ninth team in the independent GMHL and one of six 2007 expansion teams.  Temiscaming is roughly 65 kilometers from North Bay, Ontario and will make for decent locational rivalries with the Nipissing Alouettes and Espanola Kings.

The Temiscaming Royals played their first game on September 7, 2007 in Verner, Ontario against the Nipissing Alouettes.  The Royals defeated the Alouettes 6-4 for their first ever win.

The Royals were undefeated in regulation in their first fourteen games of the season.  Their first loss came on November 1, 2007, 7-4, at the hands of the Nipissing Alouettes, largely in part to Alouettes former goaltender Tristan Jones and his 58 save performance. The Royals would later acquire Jones at the deadline to help Piche guide the Royals on their playoff run.

On January 4, 2008, the Royals hosted the Moscow Selects All-star team in an exhibition game.  The Selects won the game by a score of 9-3.  This was the sixth game of seven that the Moscow team played against different GMHL clubs.

In the 07-08 Greater Metro Junior A playoffs, the Temiscaming Royals selected to play the Espanola Kings in the 1st round.  Game 1 took place in Temiscaming with the Royals defeating the Kings with a score of 8-0 to win their first ever playoff game in team history.  Marc Desgagnes recorded the first ever Temiscaming Royals playoff goal in the team's history.  Guillaume Piche recorded the first ever win and shutout in the club's playoff history.

In June 2008, the GMHL announced that the Royals have left the league with ambitions of joining the NOJHL.  Temsicaming is the second Québécois team in NOJHL history, after the Rouyn-Noranda Capitales who were in the league from 1989 to 1996.

On September 7, 2008, the Royals played their first Northern Ontario Jr. game against the North Bay Skyhawks.  The Skyhawks won 2-0.  The Royals first NOJHL win came on September 19, 2008, as they defeated the Sudbury Jr. Wolves 9-5 at home.

On December 4, 2010, Matt Zawadzki recorded a 48 save shutout against the Abitibi Eskimos. With his shutout he has the Royals first ever shutout in NOJHL history.

On May 7, 2011, the NOJHL's Spring AGM was concluded.  The Royals were officially listed as disbanded from the league.  Owner Steve McCharles has failed to make a deal with a group from Temiscaming for a sale.  That group turned around and negotiated with the Town of Temiscaming and created a new team in the GMHL called the Temiscaming Titans and took the Royals' allotted ice time.  McCharles then failed to make a deal with an ownership group from Kirkland Lake, Ontario and left the team to fold.

Season-by-season standings

Playoffs
2008 Lost Semi-final
Temiscaming Royals defeated Espanola Kings 4-games-to-none in bye round
Temiscaming Royals defeated King Wild 4-games-to-2 in quarter-final
Innisfil Lakers defeated Temiscaming Royals 4-games-to-2 in semi-final
2009 Lost Quarter-final
North Bay Skyhawks defeated Temiscaming Royals 4-games-to-none in quarter-final
2010 Lost Quarter-final
Abitibi Eskimos defeated Temiscaming Royals 4-games-to-one in quarter-final
2011 Lost Quarter-final
Sudbury Jr. Wolves defeated Temiscaming Royals 4-games-to-none in quarter-final

Head coaches

Team captains
Michael Sauvageau, 2007–08
Pier-Paul Landry, 2008–09
 No Captain, 2009–10
Robin Mendelsohn, 2010–11

All Time Royals

References

External links
Temiscaming Royals Webpage

Sport in Abitibi-Témiscamingue
Ice hockey teams in Quebec
Northern Ontario Junior Hockey League teams